Paljassaare Harbour is a seaport situated in Paljassaare, Tallinn, Estonia. Vessels enter and leave the harbour through a canal (length of canal 800 m, width 90-150m, depth 9.0m)

Overview 

It is a cargo port, which primarily specialises in handling mixed cargo, coal and oil products, as well as timber and perishables. The harbour is also used for cooking oil shipments by the neighbouring refinery.

Terminals of Paljassaare Harbour:
 oil terminal
 cooking oil terminal
 timber terminal
 coal terminal
 general cargo terminals (incl. reefer terminal)
 dry bulk terminal

References

External links 

Paljassaare Harbour at Port of Tallinn's website

Ports and harbours of Estonia
Transport in Tallinn